The 20 kilometre cross-country skiing event was part of the cross-country skiing programme for women at the 1988 Winter Olympics, in Calgary, Canada. It was the second and final time the event took place at the Olympics, with it being replaced by the 30km event. The competition was held on 25 February 1988 at the Canmore Nordic Centre.

Results

References

Women's cross-country skiing at the 1988 Winter Olympics
Women's 20 kilometre cross-country skiing at the Winter Olympics
Oly
Cross